The FIS Nordic World Ski Championships 1958 took place 2–9 March 1958 in Lahti, Finland. This marked the third time the city hosted this event having done so in 1926 and 1938. Germany returned to the FIS Nordic Ski Championships for the first time officially since 1939, albeit as East Germany and West Germany. Additionally, it was the first championships to electronic timekeeping where results were timed to the tenth of a second rather than the full second.

Men's cross-country

15 km 
4 March 1958

30 km 
2 March 1958

50 km 
8 March 1958

4 x 10 km relay
8 March 1958

Women's cross-country

10 km 
5 March 1958

3 x 5 km relay
7 March 1958

Men's Nordic combined

Individual 
2-3 March 1958

Men's ski jumping

Individual large hill 
9 March 1958

Medal table

References
FIS 1958 Cross-country results
FIS 1958 Nordic combined results
FIS 1958 Ski jumping results
Results from German Wikipedia

External links
 

FIS Nordic World Ski Championships
Nordic Skiing
Nordic world ski championships
FIS Nordic World Ski Championships
FIS Nordic World Ski Championships
Nordic skiing competitions in Finland
Sports competitions in Lahti